The 1944 Missouri gubernatorial election was held on November 7, 1944 and resulted in a narrow victory for the Democratic nominee, State Senator Phil M. Donnelly, over the Republican nominee Jean Paul Bradshaw, and candidates representing the Socialist and Socialist Labor parties.

Results

References

Missouri
1944
Gubernatorial
November 1944 events